The 2016 Supercoppa Italiana was the 29th edition of the Supercoppa Italiana, Italian football supercup. It was played on 23 December 2016 at Jassim bin Hamad Stadium in Doha, Qatar. Juventus were the defending champions. With Juventus winning both the 2015–16 Serie A championship and the 2015–16 Coppa Italia, the game was played between Juventus and the 2015–16 Coppa Italia runners-up, Milan. Milan won 4–3 on penalties following a 1–1 draw after extra time.

Match

Details

See also

 2016–17 Serie A
 2016–17 Coppa Italia

References

2016
Juventus F.C. matches
A.C. Milan matches
2016–17 in Italian football cups
International association football competitions hosted by Qatar
2016
21st century in Doha
2016–17 in Qatari football
December 2016 sports events in Asia
Supercoppa Italiana 2016